Michael Rispoli (born November 27, 1960) is an American character actor. He was a contender for the role of Tony Soprano in the HBO television series The Sopranos, but was ultimately cast as Jackie Aprile, a recurring character in the show’s first season. Rispoli reunited with Sopranos co-star James Gandolfini in the 2009 thriller The Taking of Pelham 123.

Early life and education
Rispoli, a second-generation Italian American, was raised in Tappan, New York, one of eight children, and attended Tappan Zee High School, where he played football. He majored in theater at State University of New York at Plattsburgh and graduated in 1982.

Career 
The feature film Union Square (co-written and directed by Sundance Film Festival Grand Jury Award winner Nancy Savoca) premiered in 2011 at the Toronto International Film Festival: Rispoli co-stars with Mira Sorvino, Patti LuPone, Tammy Blanchard, Mike Doyle, and Daphne Rubin-Vega.

He also starred in the Pulitzer Prize-winning play Between Riverside and Crazy by Stephen Adly Guirgis.

Filmography

Film and TV Movies

Television

References

External links
 

1960 births
Living people
People from Tappan, New York
Male actors from New York (state)
American male film actors
American male television actors
Circle in the Square Theatre School alumni
State University of New York at Plattsburgh alumni
American people of Italian descent